Many regions and provinces of Asia have alternative names in different languages. Some regions have also undergone name changes for political or other reasons. This article attempts to give all known alternative names for all major Asian regions, provinces, and territories. It also includes some lesser regions that are important because of their location or history.

This article does not offer any opinion about what the "original", "official", "real", or "correct" name of any region is or was. Regions are listed alphabetically by their current best-known name in English, which does not necessarily match the title of the corresponding article. The English version is followed by variants in other languages, in alphabetical order by name, and then by any historical variants and former names.

Foreign names that are the same as their English equivalents may be listed, to provide an answer to the question "What is that name in..."?

A

B

C

D

J

K

M

S

T

References

See also
 List of European regions with alternative names
 Endonym and exonym
 List of alternative country names
 List of country names in various languages
 Latin names of regions
 List of places

Toponymy
Lists of place names